Naveed Mukhtar is a retired three-star Pakistan Army Lieutenant General and former spymaster who served as the Director General of the ISI in office from 11 December 2016 until his retirement on 25 October 2018. Before his appointment as Director General of the ISI, Mukhtar commanded the V Corps. He is credited for having played a pivotal role in the success of Operation Lyari.

Personal life
Mukhtar belongs to an Punjabi family from the Nankana Sahib region of Punjab.

Career

Military 
Mukhtar was commissioned in the Armored Corps regiment in 1983. He joined the Army in the 68th Pakistan Military Academy course. He grew his ranks until Major with 13 Lancers. He has commanded a Mechanized Division. Naveed Mukhtar possesses a vast experience in the field of intelligence. He had also headed the counter-terrorism wing of the ISI in Islamabad.

He was promoted to the rank of Lieutenant General and posted to the V Corps as a Commander in September 2014 until 7 December 2016.

He was appointed as the Director General of the ISI on 11 December 2016.

Since 15 Jan 2021, Naveed Mukhtar is serving as the Chairman of the Army Welfare Trust.

Academic 
He graduated from the Command and Staff College, National Defence University and the prestigious United States Army War College. At the US Army War College, Mukhtar authored a strategy research project report titled 'Afghanistan – Alternative Futures and their Implications' in fulfillment of the requirements of the Master in Strategic Studies Degree.

References

Year of birth missing (living people)
Living people
Directors General of Inter-Services Intelligence
Guerrilla warfare theorists
National Defence University, Pakistan alumni
Pakistani generals
Punjabi people
Lieutenant generals